Canthigaster sanctaehelenae, known as the St. Helena sharpnose pufferfish, is a species of pufferfish in the family Tetraodontidae. It is native to the Southeast Atlantic, where it is known only from the islands of St. Helena and Ascension. It is a reef-associated species that occurs in tidal pools and rocky areas at depths of 50 m (164 ft) or less. Adults of the species are usually seen in pairs. It reaches 6.7 cm (2.6 inches) SL. It differs from other Atlantic Canthigaster species in patterning, with neither longitudinal dark stripes on the body or caudal peduncle nor a conspicuous dark spot on the dorsum.

References 

sanctaehelenae
Fauna of Saint Helena
Fauna of Ascension Island
Fish of the Atlantic Ocean
Fish described in 1870